Katie Bender may refer to:

 Katie Bender, victim of the Royal Canberra Hospital implosion
 Katie Bender (filmmaker) (born 1985), Australian film producer and director